

Iphigenellidae is a freshwater family of amphipods in the superfamily Gammaroidea. It is found in the Ponto-Caspian region, which encompasses the Black, Azov, and Caspian Seas.

Taxonomy

The family has only one recognised species.

 Iphigenella Sars, 1896
 Iphigenella acanthopoda Sars, 1896

Two species – I. andrussowi and I. shablensis – were, respectively, described by Sars and Carausu in 1894 and 1943, but these species are no longer recognized.

References

Further reading

External links 

 

Gammaridea
Crustaceans described in 2001
Freshwater crustaceans
Crustacean families